Elachista spumella is a moth of the family Elachistidae. It is found in Italy, Austria, Hungary, Slovakia, the Czech Republic and Russia.

References

spumella
Moths described in 1920
Moths of Europe